Kymi was a rural municipality in Finland, located in Kymenlaakso on the coast, about 100 km east of Helsinki. Kymi is now part of Kotka. Its population in 1939 was 21,241 and in 1944 20,924.

See also 
Kymi (river)

References

External links 
 https://web.archive.org/web/20160305042307/http://users.kymp.net/~modem486/

Geography of Finland